John Francis (Jack) Hennessy (1887–1955) was an Australian architect, with the same name as his architect father, John Francis Hennessy, with whom he was in partnership as Hennessy & Hennessy from 1912-1924. As principal of the firm after his father retired from 1924-1955, he was responsible for many major Art Deco office buildings in capital cities in Australia and New Zealand in the 1930s, as well as many projects for the Catholic Church in Queensland, and the Great Court of the University of Queensland.

Early life 
Hennessy was born on 8 January 1887 at Burwood, Sydney. After completing his secondary education at the Christian Brothers’ High School at Lewisham, and St Patrick's College, Goulburn, he studied architecture at Sydney Technical College and at the University of Pennsylvania. He gained experience with firms in America and Sydney, before becoming a partner with his father John Francis Hennessy trading as Hennessy & Hennessy in 1912. John Hennessy retired in 1924, and the firm continued under Jack Hennessy Jnr, retaining the name, though they were also known as Hennessy, Hennessy & Co.

Career 
In the 1920s, Queensland Archbishop Duhig commissioned a number of projects for the Catholic Church in Brisbane, including the never-built Holy Name Cathedral, Brisbane. In the 1930s Hennessy designed a series large office buildings for three different insurance firms in three countries, and has been described as Australia's first international architect. Another major project was the Great Court, University of Queensland in St Lucia, Brisbane, built between 1938-1979.

In 1950, Hennessy was awarded over £25,000 by the court when he sued to recover his unpaid fees for the Holy Name Cathedral.

Hennessy died of heart disease at his eldest son's home in Sydney on September 4, 1955, at the age of 68. He was buried in the Roman Catholic Cemetery at Rookwood. The firm continued until 1968.

Major extant works

 1925: Corpus Christi Church in Nundah, Brisbane
 1927-28: Villa Maria Convent, Fortitude Valley, Brisbane
 1929:  Church of Saint Ignatius Loyola in Toowong, Brisbane
 1930-31: Colonial Mutual Life, Brisbane
 1934: Colonial Mutual Life, Adelaide
1935: Colonial Mutual Life, Wellington, New Zealand
 1936: Lawson Apartments, Perth
 1936: Australian Catholic Assurance, Melbourne
 1936: Australian Catholic Assurance, Sydney 
1937: Colonial Mutual Life, Newcastle
 1937-79: Great Court, University of Queensland, St Lucia, Brisbane
1941: Pius XII Provincial Seminary, Banyo, Brisbane.

References

Architects from Sydney
1887 births
1955 deaths